Feelin' It Together is an album by saxophonist James Moody recorded in 1973 and released on the Muse label.

Reception
Allmusic awarded the album 4 stars with a review stating, "James Moody has an opportunity to show off his versatility on Feelin' It Together. He switches between tenor, alto and flute (excelling on all three instruments) with a quartet... Stimulating music".

Track listing 
All compositions by Kenny Barron except as indicated
 "Anthropology" (Dizzy Gillespie, Charlie Parker) - 9:05
 "Dreams" - 4:54  
 "Autumn Leaves" (Joseph Kosma, Johnny Mercer, Jacques Prévert) - 9:19
 "Wave" (Antônio Carlos Jobim) - 7:42
 "Morning Glory" - 7:17
 "Kriss Kross" (Art Hillery, Red Holloway) - 5:34

Personnel 
James Moody - tenor saxophone, alto saxophone, flute
Kenny Barron - piano, electric piano, harpsichord
Larry Ridley - bass
Freddie Waits - drums, percussion, tin flute

References 

James Moody (saxophonist) albums
1974 albums
Muse Records albums
Albums produced by Don Schlitten